Events in the year 1940 in Norway.

Overview 
1940 is the year when Norway became drawn into World War II. On 9 April Nazi Germany invaded the country, which remained occupied until 8 May 1945. See the article Occupation of Norway by Nazi Germany for a full exposition of World War II in Norway.

Incumbents
Government in Exile (in London) – went to exile on 7 June
 Monarch – Haakon VII
 Prime Minister – Johan Nygaardsvold (Labour Party)
German Military Governor
 Reichskommissar in Norway – Josef Terboven beginning on 24 April

Events

 16 February – Altmark Incident: The British destroyer  intercepts the German transport Altmark in Norwegian waters, recovering 299 British prisoners of war.
 8 April – In Operation Wilfred the United Kingdom places fictitious and real naval mine fields off the coast of Norway. The aim was to provoke a German response.
 9 April –
 German invasion of Norway: Nazi Germany carries out Operation Weserübung, and invades Denmark and Norway. Norway is at war for the first time since 1814. German forces land in several Norwegian ports and take Oslo; The Norwegian Campaign lasts two months.
 German invasion of Norway: Egersund is captured by the Germans without resistance.
 German invasion of Norway: Arendal is captured by the Germans without resistance.
 German invasion of Norway: Stavanger Airport, Sola is attacked and captured by the Germans.
 German invasion of Norway: Kristiansand is attacked by German warships and bombers. German troops met resistance from nearby Odderøya Fortress, which surrendered after hard battles.
 German invasion of Norway: The Norwegian armored ships  and  torpedoed and sunk by German vessels at the port of Narvik. Landing of German forces without resistance. 
 German invasion of Norway:  is sunk by gunfire and torpedoes from the Norwegian coastal fortress Oscarsborg in the Oslofjord. Of the 2,202 German crew and troops on board, some 830 died (at least 320 of them crewmen). Most either drowned or burnt to death in the flaming oil slick surrounding the wreck.
 German invasion of Norway: German air-landed soldiers land at and capture the airport at Fornebu near Oslo.
 10 April – German invasion of Norway: Germans set up a Norwegian government under Vidkun Quisling, former minister of defence.
 10 April – German invasion of Norway: The , damaged the previous day by Norwegian coastal artillery, is sunk by Fleet Air Arm dive bombers in Bergen harbour
 11 April – Norwegian Campaign: First Battle of Narvik, British destroyers and aircraft successfully make a surprise attack against a larger German naval force. A second attack on 13 April will also be a British success.
 13 April – Norwegian Campaign: British and French troops begin landing at Namsos and Harstad in Norway. The landings are aimed at recapturing Trondheim and Narvik, respectively.
 14–19 April – Norwegian Campaign: Battle of Dombås: Norwegian Army units defeat German Fallschirmjäger attack.
 24 April – German occupation of Norway: Adolf Hitler names Josef Terboven as Reichskommissar of Norway with power to invoke and enforce decrees.
 27 April – Norwegian Campaign: British troops begin pull-out from southern and central parts of Norway.
 1 May – Norwegian Campaign: Allies begin evacuating south-western and central-Norwegian ports.
 5 May – Norwegian Campaign: Hegra Fortress capitulates after all other Norwegian forces in southern Norway have laid down their arms (see Battle of Hegra Fortress).
 10 May – Norwegian Campaign: The Hurtigruten steamer  is sunk at Hemnesberget while being used as a German troop ship.
 24 May – Norwegian Campaign: The British make a final decision to cease operations in Norway.
 27 May – Norwegian Campaign: Most of Bodø was destroyed during a Luftwaffe attack. 6,000 people were living in Bodø at that time, and 3,500 people lost their homes in the attack.
 28 May – Norwegian Campaign: Norwegian, French, Polish and British forces recapture the Norwegian harbour-city Narvik which was of great strategic importance to Germany. This is the first allied infantry victory of World War II.
 7 June – Norwegian Campaign: The Norwegian Royal Family and the Norwegian Government was evacuated from Tromsø aboard the British cruiser  which later on arrived safely in London where Haakon VII and his cabinet set up a Norwegian government in exile.
 8 June – Norwegian Campaign: The last of the Allied troops leave Norway.
 10 June – Norwegian Campaign: Mainland Norway surrenders to German forces.
 16 August – The Communist Party of Norway is banned in German-occupied Norway.
 28 September – Vidkun Quisling becomes head of the German-appointed provisional councillors of state in Norway.

Unknown date 
 Norsk Hydro begins construction of a magnesium carbonate plant at Herøya, but the German invasion of Norway stops the plans.

Popular culture

Sports

Music

Film

Literature

Notable births
 
 

2 January – Karenanne Gussgard, judge
10 January – Inger Heldal, actress (died 2020).
17 January – Einar Økland, poet, playwright, essayist and children's writer.
31 January – Martin Schøyen, businessman, paleographer and book collector
15 February – 
Helen Bøsterud, politician.
Trygve Madsen, composer.
22 February – Jon Elster, social and political theorist.
3 March – Mona Røkke, politician (died 2013)
4 March – Arild Lund, politician
10 March 
Ove Rullestad, politician
Finn Thorsen, footballer
11 March 
Svein Alsaker, politician
 Kirsten Engelstad, librarian
5 April – Georg Apenes, jurist and politician (died 2016)
7 April – Rune Skarstein, economist
14 April – Per Aunet, politician
16 April – Berit Mørdre Lammedal, cross-country skier (died 2016)
18 April – Hans Flock, judge
21 April – Lilleba Lund Kvandal, soprano singer (died 2016).
23 April – Ole Didrik Lærum, physician.
2 May – Hariton Pushwagner, Pop artist (died 2018).
8 May – Karl Erik Harr, painter, illustrator, printmaker and author
12 May – Svein Hatløy, architect, professor and founder of the Bergen School of Architecture
16 May – Kjetil Bang-Hansen, actor, dancer, stage producer and theatre director
20 May – Frode Thingnæs, jazz composer, conductor and trombonist
21 May – Finn Karsten Ramstad, jurist
25 May – Gunnar Skaug, politician (died 2006)
29 May – Kjell Helland, politician
30 May – Svenn Kristiansen, politician
19 June – Tor Røste Fossen, soccer player and manager (died 2017)
20 June – Hjørdis Nerheim, philosopher (died 2020).
24 June – Oddvard Nilsen, politician
3 July – Tor Nymo, politician
6 July – Kristine Rusten, politician (died 2003)
12 July – Anne Marie Blomstereng, politician
14 July – Oddbjørn Hågård, politician
15 July – Thor-Eirik Gulbrandsen, politician
30 July – Kjellfred Weum, hurdler (died 2017)
31 July – Stig Frøland, physician.
6 August – Egil Kapstad, jazz pianist and composer (died 2017)
26 August – Gudleiv Forr, journalist
28 August – Odd Holten, politician
29 August – Gunnar Berge, politician
15 September – Jorunn Hareide, literary historian.
19 September – Tove Veierød, politician
1 October – Knut Vartdal, politician
4 October – Erik Dalheim, politician
5 October – 
Ragnar Hoen, chess player (died 2019).
 Eldrid Lunden, poet.
8 October – Knut Erik Jensen, film director
13 October – Grete Knudsen, politician
1 November – Jon Skolmen, actor and comedian (died 2019)
10 November – Stein Winge, actor, stage producer and theatre director
11 November – Arne Rinnan, ship's captain
12 November – Magnar Sætre, politician (died 2002)
18 November – Sten Lundbo, diplomat.
24 November – Atle Thowsen, historian
11 December – Ann-Marit Sæbønes, politician
12 December – Bjørn Skogmo, diplomat
15 December – Per Rolf Sævik, politician
19 December – Kirsti Coward, judge
21 December – Rolf Sagen, author

Notable deaths

17 February – Waldemar Christofer Brøgger, geologist and mineralogist (born 1851)
20 February – Nicolai A. Grevstad, diplomat, politician and newspaper editor (born 1851, died in the US)
29 March – Daniel Isaachsen, physicist (born 1859)
8 April – Leif Welding-Olsen, naval officer (born 1895)
9 April – Øyvinn Øi, military officer (born 1901)
9 April – Odd Isaachsen Willoch, naval officer (born 1885)
29 April – Ole Lilloe-Olsen, rifle shooter (born 1883)
26 June – Severin Andreas Heyerdahl, physician (born 1870)
1 August – Erling Falk, businessman and politician (born 1887)
12 August – Thorvald Astrup, architect (born 1876)
29 August – Gerda Grepp, war correspondent (born 1907)
2 October – Johan Anker, sailor and yacht designer (born 1871).
2 October – Anders Platou Wyller, philologist and humanist (born 1903)
4 October – Jacob Vidnes, trade unionist, newspaper editor and politician (born 1875)
15 October – Karl Uchermann, painter and illustrator (born 1855).
24 October – Johan Wollebæk, jurist and diplomat (born 1875)
28 October – Hans Dons, naval officer and aviator (born 1882)
4 November – Christian Sparre, politician (born 1859)
6 November – Ivar Andresen, opera singer (born 1896)
10 November – Michael Staksrud, speed skater (born 1908)
19 December – Hendrik Christian Andersen, sculptor, painter and urban planner (born 1872, died in Italy)

See also

References

External links